Swelldom was a large women's clothing store variously described as a "cloak and suit house" and a "department store", operating from 1906 until the 1970s in California. It had locations on Broadway in Downtown Los Angeles' shopping district, later on Wilshire Blvd. at Camden in Beverly Hills, and near Union Square in San Francisco.

Harry Goldberg founded Swelldom.

Los Angeles locations
Goldberg's first location opened as the Swelldom Cloak and Suit Shop in 1906 at 521 S. Broadway. 

In 1912, Swelldom secured a lease on 535 S. Broadway which it would occupy starting in 1914.

6th & Broadway (1920–1970s)
In November 1920, Swelldom moved into a new store at the northwest corner of Broadway and Sixth which it promoted as "The New Swelldom Beautiful". 

The Broadway & 6th location was expanded and extensively renovated in 1925. This building is sometimes known as the Sun Drug Company Building, Pierpont Davis was the architect, listed on the NRHP as the "Swelldom Department Store" building.

With Silverwoods on the southeast corner and Mullen & Bluett on the northeast corner of the intersection — both two of the city's prominent men's specialty stores that would both spawn chains across Southern California — Swelldom advertised during this era with the byline "The Women's Corner".

In January 1946, Swelldom renovated the location again and promoted the "New Swelldom".

Beverly Hills branch
Swelldom opened a Beverly Hills branch on Wilshire Boulevard at Camden Drive on September 9, 1943. With Saks Fifth Avenue having opened there in 1930 and the city's wealthy moving ever westward, Beverly Hills had taken over from Hollywood Boulevard as the main suburban upscale fashion district, rivaling Seventh Street downtown. The branch operated into the 1950s.

San Francisco store
In 1908 the firm opened a temporary store on Fillmore Street in San Francisco, and on May 17, 1909 a Swelldom opened an elaborate, complete store on 136–144 Grant Avenue between Post and Geary near Union Square, San Francisco.
At that time Swelldom positioned itself as offering "high-grade, exclusive apparel at moderate prices".

External links
Swelldom in the Avery Shepherd mystery series
Photo of Swelldom at NW corner of 6th & Broadway, Calisphere, University of California

References

Defunct department stores based in Greater Los Angeles